Frodsham Hodson (1770–1822) was an English churchman and academic, the Principal of Brasenose College, Oxford, from 1809.

Life
He was the son of the Rev. George Hodson, and was born in Liverpool, England, on 7 June 1770. He entered Manchester Grammar School in January 1784, and left it in 1787 to go to Brasenose College, Oxford, where he graduated B.A. on 14 January 1791, M.A. 10 October 1793, B.D. 1808, and D.D. 1809. In May 1791, he succeeded to a Hulmean exhibition, and was afterwards elected a Fellow of Brasenose College. In 1793, he gained the university prize for an essay in English prose on "The Influence of Education and Government on National Character".

In 1795, Hodson was chosen lecturer at St George's Church, Liverpool, and subsequently became chaplain there. His persistence in holding the chaplaincy, although he rarely in later years visited Liverpool, gave offence in the town. In 1803–4 and again in 1808-10, he filled the office of public examiner at Oxford. In 1808 he was appointed rector of St Mary's, Stratford-by-Bow.

In 1809, he vacated his benefice on being elected principal of Brasenose College. He presided over the college for thirteen years, and took a leading part in the affairs of Oxford University. He served the office of Vice-Chancellor in 1818, and was appointed Regius Professor of Divinity, with the appurtenant canonry of Christ Church and rectory of Ewelme, in 1820.

It was believed that Lord Liverpool intended Hodson for a bishopric, but he died, after a short illness, on 18 January 1822, aged 51. He was buried in the ante-chapel of Brasenose College, where he was commemorated in a Latin inscription by Edward Cardwell.

Works
Hodson edited Thomas Falconer's Chronological Tables, 1796. His probationary exercise as a fellow of Brasenose was published in the same year, entitled The Eternal Filiation of the Son of God asserted on the Evidence of the Sacred Scriptures, pp. 81. His only other works were three sermons published at Liverpool, and printed in 1797, 1799, and 1804.

Family
Hodson married, on 30 June 1808, Anne, daughter of John Dawson of Mossley Hill, Liverpool. He left four daughters and a son. His widow died on 23 April 1848.

References

External links
Bibliographic directory from Project Canterbury

Attribution

1770 births
1822 deaths
Clergy from Liverpool
18th-century English writers
18th-century English male writers
19th-century English writers
People educated at Manchester Grammar School
English editors
Alumni of Brasenose College, Oxford
Fellows of Brasenose College, Oxford
Principals of Brasenose College, Oxford
Vice-Chancellors of the University of Oxford
Regius Professors of Divinity (University of Oxford)